The men's 1000 metres race of the 2013–14 ISU Speed Skating World Cup 3, arranged in the Alau Ice Palace, in Astana, Kazakhstan, was held on 30 November 2013.

Shani Davis of the United States won the race, extending his winning streak from the start of the season, while Mirko Giacomo Nenzi of Italy came second, and Michel Mulder of the Netherlands came third. Pim Schipper of the Netherlands won the Division B race.

Results
The race took place on Saturday, 30 November, with Division B scheduled in the afternoon session, at 15:40, and Division A scheduled in the evening session, at 19:27.

Division A

Division B

References

Men 01000
3